The Sengkang LRT is a  automated guideway transit line in Singapore. The line, which initially opened on 18 January 2003, connects the residential districts and suburbs of Sengkang to Sengkang Town Centre, where it connects with the North East MRT line, Sengkang Bus Interchange, Compass One and Compassvale Bus Interchange. It is the second line of the LRT system in Singapore and like all other LRT lines, it is fully elevated and uses automated trains. It is the first LRT line to be operated by SBS Transit.

History
Planning for the Sengkang LRT line was underway when the Bukit Panjang LRT was opened by then-Prime Minister Goh Chok Tong on 6 November 1999. Construction began in January 2000 for both the East Loop and West Loop. Meanwhile, the Sengkang LRT line was awarded to Singapore Bus Service (present-day SBS Transit) on 20 May 1999.

On 18 January 2003, the East Loop was opened, the first section of the line to do so. The West Loop, with the exception of Farmway, Cheng Lim and Kupang stations, commenced operations on 29 January 2005. These three stations then opened on 15 November 2007, 1 January 2013 and 27 June 2015 respectively.

Improvements
On 31 October 2012, the Land Transport Authority announced that starting from first quarter of 2016, both the Sengkang and Punggol LRT systems would be upgraded to two-car trains, doubling the passenger capacity. An additional 16 more cars were to be ordered, bringing the total fleet size to 57. The longer trains also required modifications to the signalling and communication system.

On 22 December 2015, the line began operating two-car trains, five years after plans to raise the capacity of the increasingly packed light-rail system were announced.

Around the end of 2016, two-car trains started being deployed on both directions of the West Loop during the weekday peak hours, due to the increasing number of commuters living in new HDB flats located near Thanggam, Kupang and Farmway LRT stations. Before this, two-car trains were only deployed towards the direction of Cheng Lim during morning peak hours, and towards the direction of Renjong during evening peak hours.

On 15 December 2017, the Land Transport Authority said there will be limited services on parts of the Sengkang-Punggol LRT (SPLRT) on most Sundays from 14 January 2018 to 25 February that year, to facilitate renewal and improvement works (except 18 February as it is a Chinese New Year holiday). Only one platform will open for service at 5.30am on Sundays. The other platform will open from 7am. On 22nd of that month, SBS Transit said the arrangement is expected to continue until end April that year.

From 27 May to 7 October that year, limited services on Sundays will continue on the Sengkang-Punggol LRT (SPLRT). One platform will open at 5.30am and the other platform will open at 5.30pm.

On 5 February 2021, the Land Transport Authority announced that it has purchased 17 two-car trains for the Sengkang and Punggol LRT systems. The new trains will be delivered progressively from 2024 to 2027. In addition to new trains, the Sengkang Depot will also be expanded to 11.1 ha from the existing 3.5 ha to ensure there is capacity and maintenance space for the new trains. The expansion of the depot will also see two new reception tracks being built to shorten the train launching time. To ensure there is enough electricity to support the larger fleet of trains, 3 new power stations will be built, increasing the total number of power stations supporting the system to 8 once completed.

Stations

Legend

List

Services
There are four services in total, with two on each loop. However, on the Electronic Display, they will not show the service letters.

Rolling stock

The Sengkang LRT operates on the Mitsubishi Heavy Industries Crystal Mover rolling stock shared with the Punggol LRT. An initial 41 trainsets entered service in 2003 under C810, with an additional 16 trainsets were delivered in 2016 under C810A, bearing only minor exterior differences from its predecessor. They are maintained and stabled at Sengkang Depot, with a service track between the Punggol and Sengkang LRT systems for the Punggol LRT trains to head to and from the depot.

The procurement of a further 34 vehicles (17 two-car trains) to boost the capacity of the Sengkang-Punggol LRT was announced by the Land Transport Authority in February 2021.

These trains, also known as automated people movers, are rubber-tyred for minimized operating noise within built-up areas and guided by two side rails and a power rail on either side. They operate in both single-car and double-car arrangements.

Train control
The line is equipped with Kyosan APM fixed block signalling system for Automatic train control (ATC) under Automatic train operation (ATO) GoA 4 (UTO). The subsystems consist of Automatic train protection (ATP) to govern train speed, Automatic Train Supervision (ATS) to track and schedule trains, and a computer-based interlocking (CBI) system that prevents incorrect signal and track points settings.

Incidents 

 On 20 April 2015, the East Loop suffered a brief service disruption due to a power fault.
 On 8 May that year, more than two weeks after the April disruption, another service disruption occurred on the West Loop, stranding a number of trains for three hours at 1700 hrs.
 On 16 February 2018, the first day of Chinese New Year, a train broke down near Sengkang station from the West Loop due to a dislodged power collector shoe at 1109 hrs. A rescue train managed to haul the faulty train away and services were resumed approximately two hours later.

Gallery

References

External links
 Sengkang LRT line

Light Rail Transit (Singapore) lines
Sengkang
 
Crystal Mover people movers
Railway lines opened in 2003
Transport in North-East Region, Singapore
2003 establishments in Singapore
Automated guideway transit